New Athos Monastery (Novoafonskiy monastir’;) is a monastery in New Athos, municipality of Gudauta, in a breakaway republic of Abkhazia.

History 
New Athos Monastery was founded in 1875 by monks who came from the St. Panteleimon Monastery in Mount Athos. They founded the church of St. Panteleimon on Mount Iveria, on the territory of present New Athos. Construction works of the monastery were carried out in 1883-1896 as well. 

In the lower part of the bell-tower, a monastic refectory is located. In the middle of the monastic complex stands the five-domed church of St. Panteleimon, in the architecture of which traits of the so-called Neo-Byzantine style are discernible. Interior of the church is totally embellished with the mural decoration. 

The monastery is currently used by the Abkhazian Orthodox Church.

Current condition
New Athos Monastery has been given the status of culture heritage monument in Georgia.

Gallery

Sources 
 Cultural Heritage in Abkhazia, Tbilisi, 2015

References 

Religious buildings and structures in Abkhazia
Immovable Cultural Monuments of National Significance of Georgia
19th-century Christian monasteries